Cann is an English surname. Early occurrences of the name are found in north Dorset and Cornwall. The probable derivation is either from the Dorset village of Cann, or from the Old English "canne" meaning a can or cup (so the name would mean someone dwelling in a hollow or deep valley).

Notable people with the surname include:

Abraham Cann (died 1864), English sport wrestler
Adrian Cann, Canadian soccer player
A. J. Cann (born 1991), American football player
Alan Cann (born 1971), Australian rugby league footballer
Billy Cann (1882–1958), Australian rugby league footballer
Claire and Antoinette Cann, "Cann Twins", (born 1963), duo-pianists
Darren Cann, English footballer
Elizabeth Cann (born 1979), English badminton player
Frank H. Cann (1863–1935), American football coach
George Cann, Australian politician
Gerald A. Cann, United States Assistant Secretary of the Navy
Harry Cann, British footballer
Howard Cann, American basketball coach
Jamie Cann, British politician
John Cann (athlete), Australian hurdles champion
John Cann (politician) (1860–1940), Australian politician
 John William Cann (1946–2011), guitarist with Atomic Rooster, stage name John Du Cann
Johnson Cann (born 1937), British geologist
Kate Cann (born 1954), English journalist and writer
Kid Cann, American gangster
Lionel Cann (born 1972), Bermudian cricketer
Luke Cann (born 1994), Australian javelin champion
Maurice Cann (1911–1989), British motorcycle racer
Mikala Cann (born 2000), Australian rules footballer with AFLW
Mike Cann (born 1965), Welsh cricketer
Rebecca L. Cann, geneticist
Sir Robert Cann, 1st Baronet, and other Cann baronets
Sally Cann, birth name of the English presenter Sally James (presenter)
Sam Cann (born 1954), American politician
Sid Cann (1911–1996), English footballer and manager
Steven Cann (born 1988), South African-born Welsh footballer
Tedford H. Cann (1897–1963), American swimmer, United States Navy officer and Medal of Honor recipient
Thomas Cann (1858–1924), British trade unionist
Warren Cann, Canadian drummer
William Cann, birth name of the American actor William Conrad
William Derwood Cann Jr., American military officer and politician

Footnotes

Surnames of British Isles origin